The Colombo Stars (abbreviated as CS) is a franchise cricket team which competes in 2022 Lanka Premier League. The team is based in Colombo, Western Province, Sri Lanka. In November 2021, the team changed their name to Colombo Stars after changing owners. The team was captained by Angelo Mathews and coached by Ruwan Kalpage.

Current squad
 Players with international caps are listed in bold.
  denotes a player who is currently unavailable for selection.
  denotes a player who is unavailable for rest of the season.

Administration and support staff

Seasonal standings

The top four teams qualify for the playoffs
 Advance to Qualifier 1
 Advance to Eliminator

League stage

Playoffs

Eliminator

Qualifier 2

Final

Statistics

Most runs

Most wickets

References

2022 in Sri Lankan cricket
2022 Lanka Premier League